The 2001–2002 season was Liverpool Football Club's 110th season in existence and their 40th consecutive season in the top-flight of English football.

Season summary
Having finished the previous season in third place in the Premiership, as well as winning an unprecedented treble of the League, FA and UEFA Cups, hopes were high for Liverpool going into the new season. However, fixture congestion meant that Liverpool could only play six games, taking 12 points to stand in sixth place, before Gérard Houllier was forced to go to hospital after falling ill during a game against Leeds United. It was later discovered that Houllier was suffering from a heart condition and was forced to take a five-month period of convalescence, with assistant manager Phil Thompson stepping up to take over caretaker responsibilities. In spite of this crisis, Liverpool climbed to fourth at the end of October before topping the Premier League table at the end of November, with a two-point lead over second-placed Leeds while holding a game in hand. November also saw the sale of fan favourite striker Robbie Fowler to Leeds.

Liverpool kept their lead until 17 December, when Newcastle United overtook Liverpool at the top by virtue of goals scored (30 vs 25). During the month, French striker Nicolas Anelka was signed on loan from Paris Saint-Germain until the end of the campaign as a replacement for Fowler. By the end of December, Liverpool were back to fourth (albeit with the game still in hand and a margin of only two points between them and leaders Arsenal). However, Liverpool failed to take advantage of their extra game and at the end of January were still two points off the top (Manchester United now the league leaders), although they did defeat the Red Devils 1–0 at Old Trafford. This gap increased to four points by the end of February, despite a 4–0 win away to Leeds, but Houllier's return in March coincided with an upturn of form that saw Liverpool reach the Champions League quarter-finals and reclaim top place in the Premiership with five matches left to play, although fellow title challengers Arsenal had two games in hand. Arsenal, in the midst of a twelve-match winning streak, soon overhauled Liverpool and sealed the title with a 2–0 win at Bolton Wanderers. However, on the flip side Arsenal also defeated Manchester United during this winning run, allowing Liverpool to take runners-up spot with a 5–0 home win over Ipswich Town.

The 2001–02 season was the first in which Liverpool had competed in the UEFA Champions League, and their first campaign in Europe's premier club competition (previously the European Cup) since the 1984–85 season. Liverpool topped their group in the first stage, and also progressed through the second group stage, before being knocked out into the quarter-finals by eventual finalists Bayer Leverkusen, 4–3 on aggregate.

During the close season, Houllier turned down the opportunity to sign Anelka, in favour of signing temperamental Senegalese striker El Hadji Diouf, following the latter's role in Senegal's World Cup campaign. For the fifth consecutive season, Michael Owen finished the campaign as the Reds' top goalscorer, with 28 goals in all competitions (19 in the league).

Final league table

First-team squad
Squad at end of season

Left club during season

Reserve squad

Statistics

Player statistics

Transfers

In

Out

Results

Pre-season and friendlies

FA Charity Shield

UEFA Super Cup

Premier League

Results by round

FA Cup

League Cup

Champions League

Third qualifying round

First group stage

Second group stage

Quarter-finals

Notes

References

Liverpool F.C. seasons
Liverpool